The following is a list of events and releases that happened in 2020 in music in the United States.

Events

January
10 – Selena Gomez released her first studio album in four years, Rare.
Echosmith released their first studio album in six years, Lonely Generation.
13 – Lauren Daigle performed the National Anthem at the 2020 College Football Playoff National Championship at the Mercedes-Benz Superdome in New Orleans.
26 – The 62nd Annual Grammy Awards, hosted by Alicia Keys, took place at the Staples Center in Los Angeles. Billie Eilish and her brother Finneas took home the most awards with five each. Eilish won all four General field awards, including Album of the Year with When We All Fall Asleep, Where Do We Go?, both Record of the Year and Song of the Year for "Bad Guy", and Best New Artist. She is the first artist to win every major award in the same year since Christopher Cross in 1981.
31 – Taylor Swift released Miss Americana, a Netflix documentary based on the singer's life and  her recent stance on politics to critical acclaim. Along with the documentary, Swift released a song, "Only the Young" alongside the documentary.

February
2 – Demi Lovato performed the National Anthem, and Jennifer Lopez and Shakira performed the halftime show during Super Bowl LIV at Hard Rock Stadium in Miami.
3 – Green Day released their first studio album in four years, Father of All Motherfuckers.
24 – Armor for Sleep announced a reunion for a 2020 summer tour which will celebrate the 15th anniversary of their 2005 album, What to Do When You Are Dead, but soon the tour was postponed to 2021 due to the COVID-19 pandemic.

March
2 – After 35 years with the group, Flavor Flav was fired from Public Enemy.
6 – Lauv released his full-length debut studio album How I'm Feeling.
Mandy Moore released her first studio album in eleven years, Silver Landings.
Lil Uzi Vert released their long-awaited studio album "Eternal Atake"
13 – Jay Electronica released his debut studio album and his first full project in thirteen years, A Written Testimony.
20 – Legendary country singer and actor Kenny Rogers died at the age of 81.
Conan Gray released his full-length debut studio album Kid Krow, becoming the biggest new artist debut of the year.
22 – Childish Gambino, released his first studio album in four years, 3.15.20.
27 – Pearl Jam released their first studio album in seven years, Gigaton.
Jessi Alexander released her first album in six years, Decatur Country Red.

April
3 – Testament released their first studio album in four years, Titans of Creation.
 Sam Hunt released his first studio album in six years, Southside.
10 – Sparta released their first studio album in fourteen years, Trust the River.
 The Strokes released their first studio album in seven years, The New Abnormal.
 Maddie & Tae released their first studio album in five years, The Way It Feels.
17 – Fiona Apple released her first studio album in eight years, Fetch the Bolt Cutters.
22 – X released their first studio album in 27 years, Alphabetland.

May
9 – Little Richard died at the age of 87 due to bone cancer.
17 - Just Sam won the eighteenth season of American Idol. Arthur Gunn was named runner-up.
19 - Todd Tilghman was named winner of the eighteenth season of The Voice. Toneisha Harris was named runner-up.
29 – Lady Gaga released her first studio album in four years, Chromatica.

June
11 - Lady Antebellum changed their name to Lady A (a nickname fans have gave them since they first came out) in the wake of the George Floyd protests, to remove any associations the old name might have had with Civil War history, slavery and the Antebellum South.
19 – Lamb of God released their self-titled album, their first studio album of original material in five years.
Mushroomhead released their first studio album in six years, A Wonderful Life.
Phantom Planet released their first studio album in twelve years, Devastator.
23 – Hum released their first studio album in 22 years, Inlet.
26 – Kansas released their first studio album in four years, The Absence of Presence.

July
6 – Country music legend Charlie Daniels died at the age of 83.
10 – Rufus Wainwright released his first studio album in eight years, Unfollow The Rules.
 Static-X released Project Regeneration Volume 1, their first studio album in 11 years; it features the final recordings of original frontman Wayne Static who died in November 2014
 The Rentals released their first studio album in six years Q36.
 My Morning Jacket released their first studio album in five years, The Waterfall II.
17 - The Chicks, formerly known as the Dixie Chicks, released their first album in fourteen years, Gaslighter. It is also their first album under their new name. They had dropped "Dixie", which referenced the American Mason–Dixon line, separating the free and slave-owning southern states. The name change followed criticism that the word had connotations of American slavery.
24 – Neon Trees released their first studio album in six years, I Can Feel You Forgetting Me.
31 – Brandy released her first studio album in eight years, B7.

August
14 – Tanya Donelly released her first studio album in fourteen years, Tanya Donelly and the Parkingtion Sisters.
21 – Bright Eyes released their first studio album in nine years, Down in the Weeds, Where the World Once Was.
Tim McGraw released his first solo studio album in five years, Here on Earth.
22 – Singer Alex Varkatzas left Atreyu after 22 years with the band.
28 – G.E. Smith released his first studio album in five years, Stony Hill.
30 – The MTV Video Music Awards took place. Lady Gaga took home the most awards with five including Artist of the Year.

September
16 – The 55th Academy of Country Music Awards took place at the MGM Grand Garden Arena in Las Vegas, Nevada. It was originally scheduled for April 5 but was postponed due to the COVID-19 pandemic.
18 – Alicia Keys released her first studio album in four years, Alicia.
25 – Sufjan Stevens released his first solo studio album in five years, The Ascension.
 Deftones released their first studio album in four years, Ohms.

October
2 – Aloe Blacc released his first studio album in six years, All Love Everything.
 Bon Jovi released their first studio album in four years, 2020.
 Dolly Parton released her first Christmas album in 30 years, A Holly Dolly Christmas.
6 – Van Halen guitarist Eddie Van Halen died from throat cancer at the age of 65. The following month, the band officially announced their disbandment.
9 – DevilDriver released their first studio album of original material in four years, Dealing With Demons I. The first part of a double-album cycle, the second part was due to be released in 2021, but will arrive in 2023.
 Blue Öyster Cult released their first studio album in nineteen years, The Symbol Remains.
14 – The Billboard Music Awards took place, hosted by Kelly Clarkson for her third year in a row.
21 –  The CMT Music Awards took place.
23 – Armored Saint released their first studio album in five years, Punching the Sky.
30 – Busta Rhymes released his first studio album in eight years, Extinction Level Event 2: The Wrath of God.
 Mr. Bungle released their first studio album in 21 years, The Raging Wrath of the Easter Bunny Demo.
 Puscifer released their first studio album in five years, Existential Reckoning.

November
6 – Fates Warning released their first studio album in four years, Long Day Good Night.
11 – The CMA Awards took place.
12 – Billie Eilish released "Therefore I Am", the second single from her second studio album Happier Than Ever. The song made the fourth-biggest leap in Billboard Hot 100 history, vaulting from 94-2 on the chart. 
18 –  Terry Blade's debut single The Unloveable is nominated at the 11th Hollywood Music in Media Awards.
22 – The American Music Awards took place.
27 – Hatebreed released their first studio album in four years, Weight of the False Self.

December
4 – Geographer released their first full-length studio album in five years, Down And Out In The Garden Of Earthly Delights.
7 – It was announced that Bob Dylan had sold all rights in his entire song catalog to Universal Music Publishing Group. 
11 – M. Ward released his first studio album in four years, Think of Spring.
 Less Than Jake released their first studio album in seven years, Silver Linings; it is also their first album without founding drummer Vinnie Fiorello, who left the band in 2018.
 Kid Cudi released his first solo studio album in four years, Man on the Moon III: The Chosen.
12 – Charley Pride, the first Black superstar of country music died at age 86, due to complications of COVID-19.

Bands reformed

Bands on hiatus
Imagine Dragons
Night Riots
Real Friends
Stone Sour
The Chainsmokers

Bands disbanded
Babes In Toyland
JJ Doom
KMD
Madvillain
The Mowgli's
She Wants Revenge
Van Halen

Albums released in 2020

January

February

March

April

May

June

July

August

September

October

November

December

Top songs on record

Billboard Hot 100 No. 1 Songs
"All I Want for Christmas Is You" – Mariah Carey 
"Blinding Lights" – The Weeknd 
"Cardigan" – Taylor Swift 
"Circles" – Post Malone 
"Dynamite" – BTS 
"Franchise" – Travis Scott feat. Young Thug and M.I.A. 
"Life Goes On" – BTS 
"Mood" – 24kGoldn feat. Iann Dior 
"Positions" – Ariana Grande 
"Rain on Me" – Lady Gaga and Ariana Grande 
"Rockstar" – DaBaby feat. Roddy Ricch 
"Savage" – Megan Thee Stallion feat. Beyoncé 
"Savage Love (Laxed – Siren Beat)" – Jawsh 685, Jason Derulo and BTS 
"Say So" – Doja Cat feat. Nicki Minaj 
"Stuck with U" – Ariana Grande and Justin Bieber 
"The Box" – Roddy Ricch 
"The Scotts" – The Scotts, Travis Scott and Kid Cudi 
"Toosie Slide" – Drake 
"Trollz" – 6ix9ine and Nicki Minaj 
"WAP" – Cardi B feat. Megan Thee Stallion 
"Watermelon Sugar" – Harry Styles 
"Willow" – Taylor Swift

Billboard Hot 100 Top 20 Hits
All songs that reached the Top 20 on the Billboard Hot 100 chart during the year, complete with peak chart placement.

Deaths
 January 1 –
Lexii Alijai, 21, rapper
Marty Grebb, 74, rock keyboardist
Tommy Hancock, 90, country singer
 January 2 – Lorraine Chandler, 73, soul singer
 January 8 – Edd Byrnes, 87, actor and pop singer
 January 9 – Bobby Comstock, 78, rock and roll singer
 January 14 – Steve Martin Caro, 71, singer
 January 15 – Chris Darrow, 75, country and rock singer
 January 18 – David Olney, 71, folk singer-songwriter
 January 19 – 
Jimmy Heath, 93, jazz saxophonist
Robert Parker, 89, R&B singer
January 24 –
Joe Payne, 35, metal bassist
Sean Reinert, 48, metal drummer
January 25 –
Bob Gullotti, 71, free jazz drummer
Vernon Sandusky, 80, rock singer and guitarist (The Chartbusters)
January 26 – Bob Shane, 85, folk singer and guitarist
January 28 – Bob Nave, 75, bubblegum pop keyboardist
February 1 –
Harold Beane, 73, funk guitarist
Peter Serkin, 72, classical pianist
February 6 – Diego Farias, 27, progressive metalcore guitarist
February 10 – Lyle Mays, 66, jazz fusion keyboardist
February 12 – Paul English, 87, country drummer
February 13 – 
Jacob Thiele, 40, indie rock keyboardist
Buzzy Linhart, 76, folk singer-songwriter
February 19 – 
Bob Cobert, 95, composer
Pop Smoke, 20, rapper
February 25 – David Roback, 61, alternative rock and dream pop guitarist
February 28 – Mike Sommerville, 67, rock guitarist and songwriter
March 3 – Les Cauchi, 77, pop singer (Johnny Maestro & the Brooklyn Bridge)
March 4 – Barbara Martin, 76, R&B singer
March 6 – 
McCoy Tyner, 81, jazz pianist
Elinor Ross, 93, opera soprano
March 7 – Jim Owen, 78, country singer songwriter
March 9 –
Keith Olson, 74, rock bassist, record producer
Eric Taylor, 70, folk singer songwriter
March 11 – Charles Wuorinen, 81, classical composer
March 16 – Jason Rainey, 53, thrash metal guitarist 
March 20 –
Kenny Rogers, 81, country singer-songwriter, actor
Jerry Slick, 80, rock drummer
March 22
Mike Longo, 83, jazz pianist 
Eric Weissberg, 80, country and bluegrass banjoist
March 23 – Tres Warren, 41, rock singer and guitarist
March 25 – Bill Rieflin, 59, rock drummer
March 28 – Jan Howard, 91, country singer songwriter
March 29 –
Joe Diffie, 61, country singer
Alan Merrill, 69, rock singer and bassist
March 30 – Bill Withers, 81, soul and R&B singer-songwriter
March 31 – Cristina, 61, no wave singer
April 1 –
Ellis Marsalis Jr., 85, jazz pianist 
Adam Schlesinger, 52, singer-songwriter, record producer, guitarist
Bucky Pizzarelli, 94, jazz guitarist
April 2 – Vaughan Mason, 69, funk musician (Vaughan Mason & Crew, Raze)
April 4 -
Timothy Brown, 82, pop and soul singer
Alex Harvey, 73, country singer songwriter
April 7 –
Betty Bennett, 98, jazz and big band singer 
Hutch Davie, 89, pianist, arranger and composer
Steve Farmer, 71, rock guitarist, songwriter (The Amboy Dukes)
Travis Nelsen, 38, indie rock drummer
John Prine, 73, country folk singer-songwriter
Hal Willner, 64, record producer
April 8 – 
Carl Dobkins, Jr., 79, singer and songwriter
Chynna Rogers, 25, rapper
April 9 – Andrew Gonzalez, 69, Latin jazz bassist
April 10 –
Big George Brock, 87, blues harmonicist 
Jymie Merritt, 92, jazz bassist
April 15 –
Lee Konitz, 92, jazz saxophonist
Henry Grimes, 84, jazz bassist
Gary McSpadden, 77, gospel singer, songwriter, producer
April 17 – Giuseppi Logan, 84, jazz instrumentalist
April 21 – Derek Jones, 35, metalcore guitarist
April 24 – 
Hamilton Bohannon, 78, percussionist and music producer
Harold Reid, 80, country  singer songwriter
April 25 – Alan Abel, 91, classical percussionist
April 26 – Big Al Carson, 66, blues singer
April 27 – 
Troy Sneed, 52, gospel singer
Lynn Harrell, 79, classical cellist
April 28 – Bobby Lewis, 95, R&B singer
April 29 – Stezo, 51, rapper
April 30 – Sam Lloyd, 56, a cappella singer 
May 1 – Richard Cole, 72, jazz saxophonist
May 2 – Cady Groves, 30, country singer-songwriter
May 3 – Rosalind Elias, 90, opera singer
May 4
John Erhardt, 58, indie rock musician
Frederick C. Tillis, 90, jazz saxophonist
May 5 –
Sweet Pea Atkinson, 74, dance rock singer
Sonny Cox, 82, jazz saxophonist
Kiing Shooter, 24, rapper
May 8 – Andre Harrell, 59, record producer, songwriter, and rapper 
May 9 – Little Richard, 87, R&B, soul, and rock-n-roll singer
May 10 – Betty Wright, 66, R&B soul singer
May 11 – Moon Martin, 74, rockabilly singer-songwriter and guitarist
May 17 – Lucky Peterson, 55, blues guitarist
May 19 – Willie K, 59, folk ukuleleist
May 22 –
Steve Hanford, 50, punk rock drummer
KJ Balla, 23, rapper
May 24 –
Jimmy Cobb, 91, jazz drummer
Al Rex, 91, rock & roll bassist
May 25 – Bucky Baxter, 65, folk and rock guitarist
May 26 – Lennie Niehaus, 90, jazz saxophonist and film composer
May 28 – Bob Kulick, 70, hard rock guitarist (Balance, Kiss, W.A.S.P.)
May 31 – Bob Northern, 86, jazz French hornist
June 1 – Joey Image, 63, punk rock drummer
June 2 – Chris Trousdale, 34, pop singer and actor
June 7 –
Frank Bey, 74, blues singer
Floyd Lee, 86, blues singer and guitarist
June 8 – 
James Hand, 67, country singer
Bonnie Pointer, 69, R&B soul singer (The Pointer Sisters)
June 24 – Michael Hawley, 58, classical pianist
June 26 – Huey, 31, rapper
June 27 –
Pete Carr, 70, rock, pop, and soul guitarist
Freddy Cole, 88, jazz singer and pianist
Tom Finn, 71, baroque pop guitarist
June 29 – 
Stepa J. Groggs, 32, rapper (Injury Reserve)
Johnny Mandel, 94, film composer, arranger 
Benny Mardones, 73, soft rock singer, songwriter
July 1 – Max Crook, 83, pop rock keyboardist
July 3 – J. Marvin Brown, 66, soul singer
July 5 – Cleveland Eaton, 80, jazz bassist
July 6 – Charlie Daniels, 83, country singer
July 8 – Naya Rivera, 33, pop singer and actress (Glee)
July 10 – Eddie Gale, 78, jazz trumpeter
July 12 –
Rod Bernard, 79, swamp pop singer
Eleanor Sokoloff, 106, classical pianist
July 16 – Jamie Oldaker, 68, country music drummer
July 19 – Emitt Rhodes, 70, pop rock singer
July 27 – Miss Mercy, 71, psychedelic rock singer
July 29 – Malik B., 47, rapper (The Roots)
July 31 – Bill Mack, 88, country singer-songwriter
August 2 – 
Steve Holland, 66, southern rock guitarist
Larry Novak, 87, jazz pianist
Leon Fleisher, 92, classical pianist
August 4 – Tony Costanza, 52, heavy metal drummer
August 6 – Vern Rumsey, 47, indie rock bassist
August 11 – Trini Lopez, 83, pop singer
August 13 – Steve Grossman, 69, jazz fusion saxophonist
August 18 –
Ron Heathman, rock guitarist (The Supersuckers)
Hal Singer, 100, jazz saxophonist and bandleader
August 19 – 
Todd Nance, 57, jam band drummer
Randall Craig Fleischer, 61, classical conductor
August 20 – Frankie Banali, 68, rock drummer (Quiet Riot)
August 22 –
Walter Lure, 71, punk rock guitarist
D.J. Rogers, 72, soul singer
August 23 – 
Justin Townes Earle, 38, singer-songwriter
Peter King, 80, jazz saxophonist and clarinetist  
Charlie Persip, 91, jazz drummer
August 24 – Riley Gale, 35, thrash metal singer (Power Trip)
September 3 – Bill Pursell, 94, composer
September 4 – Gary Peacock, 85, jazz double-bassist
September 6 – Bruce Williamson, 49, R&B singer
September 8 – Simone Coxe, 82, electronic rock singer
September 9 – 
Ronald Bell, 68, saxophonist (Kool & The Gang)
Sid McCray, punk rock singer
September 12 – Edna Wright, 76, R&B singer
September 14 – Al Kasha, 83, pop songwriter
September 16 – Roy C, 81, soul singer
September 18 – 
Georgia Dobbins, 78, R&B singer
Pamela Hutchinson, 62, R&B singer (The Emotions)
September 21 – 
Tommy DeVito, 92, singer, guitarist (The Four Seasons)
Roy Head, 79, country singer
September 23 – W.S. Holland, 85, country music dummer
September 26 – Mark Stone, hard rock bassist 
September 29
Mac Davis, 78, country singer 
Rocco Prestia, 69, funk bassist 
October 6 – 
Eddie Van Halen, 65, rock guitarist, songwriter (Van Halen)
Johnny Nash, 80 singer, songwriter 
October 7 – Ray Pennington, 86, country singer songwriter 
October 9 – Pierre Kezdy, 58, punk rock bassist 
October 11 – Harold Betters, 92, jazz trombonist 
October 12 –
Jon Gibson, 80, minimalist  multi instrumentalist  
Kim Massie, 62, blues and soul singer
October 13 – Saint Dog, 44, rapper
October 16 – Johnny Bush, 85, country music singer songwriter 
October 18 – Chet "JR" White, 40, indie rock bassist 
October 21 – Viola Smith, 107, swing and classical drummer
October 22 – Margie Bowes, 79, country singer
October 23 – Jerry Jeff Walker, 78, country singer songwriter 
October 26 – Stan Kesler, 92, rock and roll singer, songwriter 
October 28 – Billy Joe Shaver, 81, country singer, songwriter 
October 31 – 
MF DOOM, 49, rapper
Rance Allen, 71, gospel singer, guitarist and keyboardist
November 1 – Nikki McKibbin, 42, singer, American Idol season one third place finalist
November 5 – Len Barry, 78, soul singer
November 6 – King Von, 26, rapper
November 10 – Alec Baillie, 73, bassist
November 11 – 
Andrew White, jazz saxophonist
MO3, 28, rapper
November 12 – Jim Tucker, 74, rock guitarist
November 13 – Doug Supernaw, 60, country singer
November 16 – Bruce Swedien, 86, recording engineer
November 23 – Hal Ketchum, 67, country singer
November 25 – Camilla Wicks, 92, classical violinist
December 7 – 
LD Beghtol, 55, experimental rock singer
Howard Wales, 77, jazz and rock keyboardist
December 8 – Harold Budd, 84, avant-garde composer and poet 
December 9 – 
Sean Malone, 50, progressive metal bassist (Cynic)
Jason Slater, 49, alternative rock bassist
December 12 – Charley Pride, 86, country singer
December 15 – Sam Jayne, 46, indie rock singer and guitarist
December 16 – Carl Mann, 78, rockabilly singer
December 17 – 
Jeff Clayton, 66, jazz saxophonist
Stanley Cowell, 79, jazz pianist
December 19 – Clay Anthony, 61, hard rock bassist
December 21 – K.T. Oslin, 78, country singer
December 23
John Fletcher, 56, rapper
Leslie West, 75, hard rock singer and guitarist
December 25 – Tony Rice, 69, bluegrass guitarist
December 29 –
Phyllis McGuire, 89, pop singer (The McGuire Sisters)
Rudy Salas, 71, R&B and soul guitarist
December 30 –
Frank Kimbrough, 64, jazz pianist 
Alto Reed, 72, rock saxophonist
Eugene Wright, 97, jazz bassist

See also
2020s in music

References